The Boys' 200 metres at the 2013 World Youth Championships in Athletics was held  on 13 and 14 July.

Medalists

Records 
Prior to the competition, the following records were as follows.

Heats 
Qualification rule: first 2 of each heat (Q) qualified.

Semifinals 
Qualification rule: first 2 of each heat (Q) plus the 2 fastest times (q) qualified.

Heat 1

Heat 2

Heat 3

Final

References 

2013 World Youth Championships in Athletics